Fremington can refer to:

Fremington, Devon, England
Fremington, North Yorkshire, England